Virtual Storage Platform is the brand name for a Hitachi Data Systems line of computer data storage systems for data centers. Model numbers include G200, G400, G600, G800, G1000, G1500 and G5500

History 

Hitachi Virtual Storage Platform, also known as VSP was first introduced in September, 2010. This storage platform builds on the design of Universal Storage Platform V, originally released in 2007.

Architecture 

At the heart of the system is the HiStar E-Network, a network crossbar switch matrix. This storage platform is made up of different technologies than USP and USP V. The connectivity to back-end disks is via 6Gbit/s SAS links instead of 4Gbit/s Fibre Channel loop. The internal processors are now Intel multi-core processors, and in addition to 3.5-inch drives support has been added for 2.5 inch small-form factor HDDs. The VSP supports SSD, SAS and SATA drives.

Features included:

The ability for growth in three ways:
Scale up to meet increasing demands by dynamically adding processors, connectivity and capacity in a single unit. This enables tuning the configuration for optimal performance for both open systems and mainframe environments.
Scale out to meet demands by dynamically combining multiple units into a single logical system with shared resources. Support increased needs in virtualized server environments and ensure safe multitenancy and quality of service through partitioning of cache and ports.
Scale deep to extend the functions of Hitachi Virtual Storage Platform to multivendor storage through virtualization. Offload less-critical data to external tiers in order to optimize the availability of the tier one resources.
Supports automated storage tiering, known as Dynamic Tiering, to automate the movement of data between tiers to optimize performance.
Front to back cooling airflow for more efficient cooling
Improved capacity per square foot and lower power consumption compared to the USP V.
Enables virtualization of external SAN storage from Hitachi and other vendors into one pool
Supports online local and distance replication and migration of data nondisruptively internally and between heterogeneous storage, without interrupting application I/O through use of products such as  Tiered Storage Manager, ShadowImage, TrueCopy  and Universal Replicator.
Single image global cache accessible across all virtual storage directors for maximum performance.
Automated wide-striping of data, which allows pool balancing and lets volume grow or shrink dynamically.
The system can scale between one and six 19-inch rack cabinets. It can hold a maximum of 2,048 SAS high-density 2.5-inch drives for 1.2 petabytes of capacity, or 1,280 3.5-inch SATA drives for a maximum capacity of 2.5 petabytes.
Supports thin provisioning and storage reclamation on internal and external virtual storage
Provides encryption, WORM and data shredding services, data resilience and business continuity services and content management services.

Delivering on enterprise demands for real-time customer engagement requires more than a fast storage array. It requires an end-to-end approach to data management that leverages both the storage operating system and flash media, to deliver low latency performance even as data levels grow exponentially. Current all-flash arrays (AFAs) rely on performance management to be handled in the array controller along with all other operations, such as data reduction. As data levels increase, they can cause controller bottlenecks, sporadic response times and a poor customer experience. To offset this issue, IT organizations have been forced to make tradeoffs in the number of workloads or amount of data they store on an individual AFA. These decisions result in the need to deploy and support more systems, raising costs and increasing management complexity. Hitachi understands this and has enhanced Hitachi Storage Virtualization Operating System RF (SVOS RF), which  powers our award-winning Hitachi Virtual Storage Platforms (VSP). Storage Virtualization Operating System integrated with Hitachi Accelerated Flash (HAF) fundamentally changes this paradigm. Now organizations can  engage customers faster, simplify storage operations and leverage the cloud for a superior return on investment. HAF is powered with flash optimizations to SVOS RF and unique solid-state hardware design. This approach eliminates these performance tradeoffs and answers demands for intelligent high performance, predictable, submillisecond response time and improved data center efficiency. With more than 350 flash patents, SVOS RF optimizations are engineered to accelerate the I/O path for access to flash devices. The result is a complete “flash-accelerated” refresh of the operating system that delivers significantly improved I/O processing, higher multithreading support and faster internal data movement. It also reduces response times considerably. 

With SVOS RF, organizations benefit: 

 Flash-aware I/O stack accelerates data access.
 Leading storage virtualization consolidates investments.
 Best-in-class business continuity prevents outages.
 Adaptive data reduction services reduce storage needs.
 Direct connect to cloud assures predictable, ongoing IT costs.

FMD disk technology is the fastest disk technology before NVMe technology came along. NVMe technology provides a much faster and reliable experience. In addition, it is predicted that 75% of the disk technology in the world will be to NVMe by 2022.

Running on Hitachi VSP family systems, HAF enables sub-millisecond  delivery on a petabyte scale. The purpose of this white paper is to take a close look at Hitachi Accelerated Flash. The discussion focuses on the uniqueness of this solution. It considers why and how these technologies can meet the increasing IT challenges of  large and small enterprises as they focus on the management challenges of their high-velocity data.

Specifications 

Virtual Storage Platform specifications in 2010 were:

Frames (19-inch racks) - Integrated Control Chassis/Disk Chassis Frame (2) and up to 4 optional Disk Chassis Frames
HiStar-E Network - Number of grid switches 4 pair (8)
Aggregate bandwidth (GB/sec) - 192
Aggregate IOPS - 5,600,000
Cache Memory
Number of data cache adapters (DCA) 2-16
Module capacity 2-8GB
Maximum cache memory 1,024GB
Control Memory
Number of control memory modules 2-8
Module capacity 2-4GB
Maximum control memory 32GB
Front End Directors (Connectivity)
Number of Directors 2-24
Fibre Channel host ports per Director - 8 or 16
Fibre Channel port performance - 2, 4, 8 Gbit/s
Maximum Fibre Channel host ports - 192
Virtual host ports - 1,024 per physical port
Maximum IBM FICON host ports - 192
Maximum IBM FCoE host ports - 96
Logical Devices (LUNs) — Maximum Supported
Open systems 65,536
IBM z/OS 65,536
Disks
Type: Flash 200GB (2.5"), 400GB (3.5")
Type: SAS 146, 300, 600GB (2.5")
Type: SATA II 2TB
Number of disks per system (max) 2.5" - 2,048; 3.5" - 1,280
Number spare disks per system (min-max) 1-256
Maximum Internal Raw Capacity - (2TB disks) 2.52PB
RAID 1, 5, 6 support
Maximum internal and external capacity 255PB
Max. Usable Internal capacity RAID-5 (7D+1P)
OPEN-V 2,080.8TB
z/OS 3390M 2,192.2TB
Max. Usable Internal Capacity RAID-6 (6D+2P)
OPEN-V 1,879TB
z/OS 3390M 1,779.7TB
Max. Usable Internal Capacity RAID-1+0 (2D+2D)
 OPEN-V 1,256.6TB
 z/OS 3390M 1,190.2TB
Virtual Storage Machines 32 max
Back End Directors 2-8
Operating System Support
Mainframe
IBM: z/OS, z/OS.e, OS/390, z/VM, VM/ESA, zVSE, VSE/ESA, MVS/XA, MVS/ESA, TPF, Linux for IBM S/390 and zSeries;
Open systems
HP: HP-UX, Tru64 UNIX, Open VMS
IBM: AIX
Microsoft: Windows Server 2000, 2003, 2008
Novell: NetWare, SUSE Linux
Red Hat: Enterprise Linux
Oracle: Solaris
VMware: ESX Server

Storage Management 

Hitachi Command Suite (formerly Hitachi Storage Command Suite) delivers management along three dimensions in support of  the system as it does for all of the company's  systems. 3D management simplifies operations and lowers costs along three distinct dimensions:
Manage up to scale with the largest infrastructure deployments
Manage out with breadth to manage storage, servers and the IT infrastructure
Manage deep with the integration required to manage the multivendor resources of today’s complex data centers
Command Suite provides integrated storage resource management, tiered storage and business continuity software solutions allowing customers to align their storage with application requirements based upon metrics including Quality-of-Service, Service Level Objectives, Recovery Time Objectives and Recovery Point Objectives. Hitachi Command Suite employs a use case-driven, step-by-step wizard-based approach that allows administrators to perform tasks such as new volume provisioning, configuration of external storage, and creation/expansion of storage pools easily on the fly.

Hitachi Command Suite is composed of the following software
products:
Hitachi Basic Operating System
Hitachi Dynamic Provisioning
Hitachi Device Manager
Hitachi Dynamic Link Manager Advanced
Hitachi Basic Operating System V
Hitachi Universal Volume Manager
Hitachi Dynamic Tiering
Hitachi Command Director
Hitachi Storage Capacity Reporter, powered by APTARE
Hitachi Tiered Storage Manager
Hitachi Tuning Manager
Hitachi Virtual Server Reporter, powered by APTARE

Hitachi Command Suite also supports management interfaces such as SNMP and SMI-S.

References 

Computer storage devices
Hitachi storage servers